Nadzeya Darazhuk (born 23 January 1990) is a Belarusian racewalker. In 2019, she competed in the women's 50 kilometres walk at the 2019 World Athletics Championships held in Doha, Qatar. She finished in 13th place.

In 2018, she finished in 11th place in the women's 50 kilometres walk at the 2018 European Athletics Championships held in Berlin, Germany.

References

External links 
 

Living people
1990 births
Place of birth missing (living people)
Belarusian female racewalkers
World Athletics Championships athletes for Belarus